The cabinet of Ion Gigurtu was the government of Romania from 4 July to 4 September 1940.

Ministers
The ministers of the cabinet were as follows:

President of the Council of Ministers:
Ion Gigurtu (4 July - 4 September 1940)
Vice President of the Council of Ministers:
Gen. Gheorghe Mihail (4 July - 4 September 1940)
Minister of the Interior:
Gen. David Popescu (4 July - 4 September 1940)
Minister of Foreign Affairs: 
Mihail Manoilescu (4 July - 4 September 1940)
Minister of Finance:
(interim) Gheorghe N. Leon (4 July - 4 September 1940)
Minister of Justice:
Ion V. Gruia (4 July - 4 September 1940)
Minister of National Defence:
Gen. Constantin Nicolaescu (4 July - 4 September 1940)
Minister of Air and Marine:
Adm. Nicolae Păiș (4 July - 4 September 1940)
Minister of Materiel:
Mihail Priboianu (4 July - 4 September 1940)
Minister of National Economy:
Gheorghe N. Leon (4 July - 4 September 1940)
Minister of Agriculture and Property
(interim) Gheorghe N. Leon (4 July - 4 September 1940)
Minister of Public Works and Communications:
Ion Macovei (4 July - 4 September 1940)
Minister of Foreign Trade:
(interim) Gheorghe N. Leon (4 July - 4 September 1940)
Minister of National Education:
Dumitru Caracostea (4 July - 4 September 1940)
Minister of Religious Affairs and the Arts:
Horia Sima (4 - 8 July 1940)
Radu Budișteanu (8 July - 4 September 1940)
Minister of Labour:
Stan Ghițescu (4 July - 4 September 1940)
Minister of Health and Social Security
Victor Gomoiu (4 July - 4 September 1940)
Minister of Public Wealth:
Vasile Noveanu (4 July - 4 September 1940)
Minister of Propaganda:
Nichifor Crainic (4 July - 4 September 1940)
Minister of State for Minorities:
Hans Otto Roth (4 July - 4 September 1940)

References

Cabinets of Romania
Cabinets established in 1940
Cabinets disestablished in 1940
1940 establishments in Romania
1940 disestablishments in Romania